Kewhira Dielie (lit. Kohima News) was a monthly Tenyidie newspaper published from Kohima. It was the first modern newspaper from present-day Nagaland, India. The newspaper was a single-sheet legal sized paper printed on both sides and was published by George W. Supplee, an American Baptist Missionary who was based in Kohima.

See also 
 List of newspapers in Nagaland

References 

Newspapers published in Nagaland
Kohima
Mass media in Nagaland